Foss Peak is a 6,524-foot-elevation summit in the Tatoosh Range which is a sub-range of the Cascade Range. It is located south of Mount Rainier within Mount Rainier National Park, in Lewis County of Washington state. The peak is named for Thea Foss (1857-1927) who founded the Foss Maritime Company with her husband in 1889. The peak also has an alternate name, Manatee Mountain. The nearest higher neighbor is West Unicorn Peak,  to the southeast. Precipitation runoff from the mountain drains into tributaries of the Cowlitz River.

Climate
Foss Peak is located in the marine west coast climate zone of western North America. Most weather fronts originate in the Pacific Ocean, and travel east toward the Cascade Mountains. As fronts approach, they are forced upward by the peaks of the Cascade Range (Orographic lift), causing them to drop their moisture in the form of rain or snowfall onto the Cascades. As a result, the west side of the North Cascades experiences high precipitation, especially during the winter months in the form of snowfall. During winter months, weather is usually cloudy, but, due to high pressure systems over the Pacific Ocean that intensify during summer months, there is often little or no cloud cover during the summer. Because of maritime influence, snow tends to be wet and heavy, resulting in high avalanche danger.

Gallery

References

External links
 National Park Service web site: Mount Rainier National Park

Cascade Range
Mountains of Lewis County, Washington
Mountains of Washington (state)
North American 1000 m summits